Komjatice is a municipality and village in the Nové Zámky District of the south-west of Slovakia, in the Nitra Region.

Etymology

The name comes from komňata - a well equipped room, usually for guests (in the modern Slovak komnata: a well equipped room in a manor house or castle). The village was on an important trade route and was named after the services provided in it (accommodation for guests).

Population
It has a population of about 4207 people of which 4125 are Slovaks and 
28 are Hungarians.

The settlement had Hungarian majority as early as the 17th century according to the Turkish tax census.

Main sights 
 Church of St. Elizabeth located in center of village
 Church of St. Peter and Paul located at western end of village
 Lake Štrkáreň located east of village along road to Černík.
 Park located in center of village contains some interesting nonnative trees.
 The Priest's Hole (Kňazova jama)

Genealogical resources

The records for genealogical research are available at the state archive "Statny Archiv in Nitra, Slovakia"

 Roman Catholic church records (births/marriages/deaths): 1709-1918 (parish A)
 Lutheran church records (births/marriages/deaths): 1887-1954 (parish B)
 Reformated church records (births/marriages/deaths): 1784-1895 (parish B)

See also
 List of municipalities and towns in Slovakia

External links 
 http://www.komjatice.sk
Komjatice – Nové Zámky Okolie
Surnames of living people in Komjatice

Villages and municipalities in Nové Zámky District